Common may refer to:

Places
 Common, a townland in County Tyrone, Northern Ireland
 Boston Common, a central public park in Boston, Massachusetts
 Cambridge Common, common land area in Cambridge, Massachusetts
 Clapham Common, originally common land, now a park in London, UK
 Common Moss, a townland in County Tyrone, Northern Ireland
 Lexington Common, a common land area in Lexington, Massachusetts
 Salem Common Historic District, a common land area in Salem, Massachusetts

People
 Common (rapper) (born 1972), American hip hop artist, actor, and poet
 Andrew Ainslie Common (born 1841), English amateur astronomer
 Andrew Common (born 1889), British shipping director
 John Common, American songwriter, musician and singer
 Thomas Common (born 1850), Scottish translator and literary critic

Arts, entertainment, and media
 Common (film), a 2014 BBC One film, written by Jimmy McGovern, on the UK's Joint Enterprise Law
 Dol Common, a character in The Alchemist by Ben Jonson
Harvard Common Press of Boston, Massachusetts, a publisher of cookbooks and parenting books
The Common Room, a former interactive TV show on ITV Play

Religion
 Common (liturgy), a part of certain Christian liturgy
 Common, translation of tum'ah, a biblical term for ritual impurity, used by some common English translations of the bible

Science and technology
 COMMON, the largest association of users of mid-range IBM computers
 COMMON, a Fortran statement
 Common or vernacular, the layman's but not scientific name of a plant or animal

Other uses
 Common (behavior), vulgar behavior or attitude of a common person
 Common (company), an American coliving company founded in 2015
 Common (horse), a British thoroughbred racehorse
 Common Application, an undergraduate college admission application
 Common land or town common, land on which multiple entities share certain traditional rights, such as grazing livestock or collecting firewood
 Common language, also known as lingua franca, a language shared by speakers of different mother tongues
 Common Room (university) or combination room, organized groups of students and the academic body that provide representation in the organisation of college or dormitory life, to operate certain services within these institutions such as laundry or recreation, and to provide opportunities for socialising
 Common room, shared space in a building
 Common (script), name for generic script characters, ISO code

See also

 Common Good (disambiguation)
 Commoner (disambiguation)
 Commons (disambiguation)
 The Common (disambiguation)